The King's Christmas Speech, formally known as His Majesty The King's Christmas Message is a broadcast by the reigning King of Spain to Spanish people every Christmas Eve since 1975. The speech is aired on all Spanish TV channels.

Broadcast
The message typically combines a chronicle of that year's major events, with specific focus on politics, economy, culture and social affairs, and also the sovereign's own personal feelings on Christmas.

In Spain and on the Internet, the King's Christmas Speech is not broadcast until 21:00 on 24 December.

Recurrent topics
During his reign, King Juan Carlos I usually covered the main problems of the nation, such as ETA. In 2004, the speech was highly related to the 11 March 2004 Madrid train bombings; in 2006 the King discussed the need to become a united nation against terrorism (in implicit support of Prime Minister José Luis Rodríguez Zapatero's anti-terrorist policies) and he mentioned the increasing force of immigrants in Spain and appreciated their contribution to the economy.

Special speeches

In popular culture
During his reign, Juan Carlos began his speeches with the phrase "La reina y yo" ("The Queen and I"). This is commonly considered the King's main catchphrase and as such has often been parodied by media. A comic strip in El Jueves magazine about the monarchy takes his title from this. In a departure from his father's custom, King Felipe VI did not start his 2015 speech with the phrase "La reina y yo", rather saying Buenas Noches ("Good Night").
The King's speech has been parodied in many television shows such as Buenafuente.
Mariano Rajoy's speech on the occasion of Fiesta Nacional de España was criticized by the Left because it seemed too similar to the King's Christmas speech. Rajoy delivered his message seated near the flag of Spain and in a medium shot, just as royal speeches usually are.

References

Christmas in Spain
Spanish monarchy
Speeches by heads of state